The American Civil War made a huge impact on Tennessee, with large armies constantly destroying its rich farmland, and every county witnessing combat. It was a divided state, with the Eastern counties harboring pro-Union sentiment throughout the conflict, and it was the last state to officially secede from the Union, in protest of President Lincoln's April 15 Proclamation calling forth 75,000 members of state militias to suppress the rebellion. Although Tennessee provided a large number of troops for the Confederacy, it would also provide more soldiers for the Union Army than any other state within the Confederacy.

In February 1862, some of the war's first serious fighting took place along the Tennessee and Cumberland rivers, recognized as major military highways, and mountain passes such as Cumberland Gap were keenly competed-for by both sides. The Battle of Shiloh and the fighting along the Mississippi brought glory to the little-known Ulysses S. Grant, while his area commander Henry Halleck was rewarded with a promotion to General-in-Chief. The Tullahoma campaign, led by William Rosecrans, drove the Confederates from Middle Tennessee so quickly that they did not take many casualties, and were strong enough to defeat Rosecrans soon afterward. At Nashville in December 1864, George Thomas routed the Army of Tennessee under John Bell Hood, the last major battle fought in the state.

The military governor of Tennessee was Andrew Johnson, selected by Lincoln as a Southerner to balance the ticket in the 1864 general election. On Lincoln's assassination, Johnson was sworn in as president.

Origins

Pro-Union and anti-Republican sentiment before the attack on Fort Sumter

Initially, most Tennesseans showed little enthusiasm for breaking away from a nation whose struggles it had shared for so long. In 1860, they had voted by a slim margin for the Constitutional Unionist John Bell, a native son and moderate who continued to search for a way out of the crisis.

A vocal minority of Tennesseans spoke critically of the Northern states and the Lincoln presidency. "The people of the South are preparing for their next highest duty– resistance to coercion or invasion," wrote the Nashville Daily Gazette on January 5, 1861. The newspaper expressed the view that Florida, Georgia, and Alabama were exercising the highest right of all by taking control of all forts and other military establishments within the area– the right to self-defense. A pro-secessionist proposal was made in the Memphis Appeal to build a fort at Randolph, Tennessee, on the Mississippi River.

Governor Isham G. Harris convened an emergency session of the Tennessee General Assembly in January 1861.  During his speech before the legislative body on January 7, he described the secession of the Southern states as a crisis caused by "long continued agitation of the slavery question" and "actual and threatened aggressions of the Northern States ... upon the well-defined constitutions rights of the Southern citizen." He also expressed alarm at the growth of the "purely sectional" Republican Party, which he stated was bound together by the "uncompromising hostility to the rights and institutions of the fifteen Southern states." He identified numerous grievances with the Republican Party, blaming them for inducing slaves to run off by means of the Underground Railroad, John Brown's raids, and high taxes on slave labor.

Harris agreed with the idea of popular sovereignty, that only the people within a state can determine whether or not slavery could exist within the boundaries of that state. Furthermore, he regarded laws passed by Congress that made U.S. territories non-slave states as taking territories away from the American people and making them solely for the North, territories from which "Southern men unable to live under a government which may by law recognize the free negro as his equal" were excluded. Governor Harris proposed holding a State Convention. A series of resolutions were presented in the Tennessee House of Representatives by William H. Wisener against the proposal.  He declared passing any law reorganizing and arming the state militia to be inexpedient.

The centrality of the question of slavery to the secession movement was not doubted by people at the time of the Civil War, nor was it ignored by the contemporary press. Especially in the case of the pro-slavery papers, this question of the possibility of the eventual granting of equal rights for people of color was not couched in diplomatic phraseology: 
The election, be it remembered, takes place on the 9th, and the Delegates meet in Convention on the 25th instant. If you desire to wait until you are tied hand and foot then vote for the men who advocate the 'watch and wait' policy. If you think you have rights and are the superiors of the black man then vote for the men who will not sell you out, body and soul to the Yankee Republicans - for men who would rather see Tennessee independent out of the Union, then in the Union subjugated. [emphasis in original] 

On February 3, 1861, the pro-Union Knoxville Whig published a "Secret Circular" that had mistakenly been sent by its authors to a pro-Union Tennessee U.S. Postmaster.  In it was revealed a comprehensive plan by pro-slavery Tennesseans and others to launch a propaganda campaign to convince Tennesseans that the strength of the pro-secessionist movement was overwhelming:
 Dear Sir — Our earnest solicitude for the success of the Great Southern Rights movement to secure an immediate release from the overwhelming dangers that imperil our political and social safety, will we trust, be a sufficient apology for the results which we beg to impose on you.  The sentiment of the Southern heart is overwhelming in favor of the movement. Light only is wanted that men many see their way clearly and the prayer of every true patriot will eventually be realized. Tennessee will be a unit. Although the time be so very short, this object may yet be accomplished, if a few men only, (the more the better, however) in each county, will devote their entire energies to it during the canvass for Delegates. We earnestly beg your attention, therefore, to the following suggestions:

Be sure to have your best men in the field, WITHOUT REGARD TO PAST POLITICAL OPINIONS.
Be sure that no submissionist, under whatever pretext of compromising our rights, or of waiting beyond the 4th of March for new guarantees, impose himself on you. Our only hope of peace and safety consists in decided action before the inauguration of Mr. Lincoln.
Do not wait for general meetings of citizens, but get together immediately a few active, intelligent, discreet but thoroughgoing, uncompromising, true-hearted, "Southern-Rights Anti-Coercion" friends and appoint Committees and Canvassers, who are willing to devote themselves entirely and unceasingly to the great and perilous work, from this hour up to the close of the election.
Appoint Committees, also, for each Civil District, of men known to coincide with you and ourselves in sentiment.
Organize, forthwith, Southern Rights Anti-Coercion Societies.
We will send during the canvass, the UNION AND AMERICAN and GAZETTE, to supply your County. These we confidently trust you will send immediately to the District Committees, who on the hour of delivery, start out on the work of distribution, and this though there be but half a dozen copies for each district. Do not, we beg of you, wait for persons to call for documents, of papers to read and CIRCULATE.
Write as many letters to your friends [as] possible, and urge them by every consideration of patriotism, to work, work, work.

[...] We can, we must, carry our State. Our hearts would link within us, at the bare thought of the degradations and infamy of abandoning our more Southern brethren united to us by all the views so sympathy and interest, and of being chained to the car of Black Republican States, who would themselves despise us for our submission; and worse than all, by moral influences alone, if not by force of legal enactment destroy our entire social fabric, and all real independence of thought and action.
Your own good judgment will suggest many things we can not now allude to. [emphasis added]
Very Respectfully,
[Signed]Wm. Williams, Chm'n./S. C. Goethall [?], Sec'y,/Andrew Cheatham/J. R. Baus [?]/R. H. Williamson/G. W. Cunningham/H. M. Cheatham, W. S. Peppin

States Central Southern Rights Anti-Coercion Committee

In Memphis, Unionists held two torchlight processions to honor their cause. The secessionists replied with their own demonstrations and a celebratory ball. That week, on February 9, the state of Tennessee was to vote on whether or not to send delegates to a State Convention that would decide on secession. The General Assembly convened by Governor Isham Harris did not believe it had the authority to call a State Convention without a vote of the people.

In February 1861, 54 percent of the state's voters voted against sending delegates to a secession convention, defeating the proposal for a State Convention by a vote of 69,675 to 57,798. If a State Convention had been held, it would have been very heavily pro-Union. 88,803 votes were cast for Unionist candidates and 22,749 votes were cast for Secession candidates. That day the American flag was displayed in "every section of the city," with zeal equal to that which existed during the late 1860 presidential campaign, wrote the Nashville Daily Gazette.  The proponents of the slavocracy were embarrassed, demoralized and politically disoriented but not willing to admit defeat:  "Whatever may be the result of the difficulties which at present agitate our country - whether we are to be united in our common destiny or whether two Republics shall take the place of that which has stood for nearly a century, the admired of all nations we will still bow with reverence to the sight of the stars and stripes, and recognize it as the standard around which the sons of liberty can rally [...]. And if the remonstrances of the people of the South-pleading and begging for redress for years-does not in this critical moment, arouse her brethren of the North to a sense of justice and right, and honor demands a separation, we would still have the same claims upon the 'colors of Washington, great son of the South, and of Virginia, mother of the States.' Let us not abandon the stars and stripes under which Southern men have so often been led to victory." "On the corner across from the newspaper office, a crowd had gathered around a bagpipe player playing Yankee Doodle, after which ex-mayor John Hugh Smith gave a speech that was received with loud cheers.

In a letter to Democratic senator Andrew Johnson, the publisher of the Clarksville (TN) Jeffersonian, C.O. Faxon, surmised that the margin by which the "No Convention" vote won would have been even greater, had Union men not been afraid that if a State Convention were not called then, then Isham Harris would have again called for a State Convention when more state legislators were "infected with the secession epidemic" [...] " Gov Harris is Check mated [sic]. The Union maj[ority] in the State will almost defy computation [.] So far as heard from the disunionist have carried by a single precinct. The Union and American [Nashville, TN pro-secessionist paper] Stands rebuked and damned before the people of the State"

On March 7, the Memphis Daily Appeal wrote that the abolitionists were attempting to deprive the South of territories won during the U.S.-Mexican War. It pointed out that the slave states had furnished twice as many volunteers as the free states and territories, though it did not note that slave states were the ones who most supported the war.

On March 19, the editors of the Clarksville Chronicle endorsed a pro-Union candidate for state senator in Robertson, Montgomery, and Stewart counties.

On April 2, the Memphis Daily Appeal ran a satirical obituary for Uncle Sam, proclaiming him to have died of "irrepressible conflict disease," after having met Abraham Lincoln. One Robertson County slave owner complained that she could not rent her slaves out for "half [of what] they were worth" because "the negros think when Lincoln takes his last, they will all be free."

Reaction to the attack on Fort Sumter
With the attack on Fort Sumter on April 12, 1861, followed by Lincoln's April 15 call for 75,000 volunteers to put the seceded states back into line, public sentiment turned dramatically against the Union.

Historian Daniel Crofts thus reports:
Unionists of all descriptions, both those who became Confederates and those who did not, considered the proclamation calling for seventy-five thousand troops "disastrous." Having consulted personally with Lincoln in March, Congressman Horace Maynard, the unconditional Unionist and future Republican from East Tennessee, felt assured that the administration would pursue a peaceful policy. Soon after April 15, a dismayed Maynard reported that "the President's extraordinary proclamation" had unleashed "a tornado of excitement that seems likely to sweep us all away." Men who had "heretofore been cool, firm and Union loving" had become "perfectly wild" and were "aroused to a frenzy of passion." For what purpose, they asked, could such an army be wanted "but to invade, overrun and subjugate the Southern states." The growing war spirit in the North further convinced southerners that they would have to "fight for our hearthstones and the security of home." 

Governor Isham Harris began military mobilization, submitted an ordinance of secession to the General Assembly, and made direct overtures to the Confederate government.

Tennessee secedes

In the June 8, 1861 referendum, East Tennessee held firm against separation, while West Tennessee returned an equally heavy majority in favor. The deciding vote came in Middle Tennessee, which went from 51 percent against secession in February to 88 percent in favor in June. The voting was accused of being fraudulent; in some counties in East Tennessee Unionists threatened violence against those voting for secession, while in other places soldiers remained at the polls to hiss at those with a Unionist ballot.

Having ratified by popular vote its connection with the fledgling Confederacy, Tennessee became the last state to declare formally its withdrawal from the Union.

Major campaigns

1862
Control of the Cumberland and Tennessee Rivers was important in gaining control of Tennessee during the age of steamboats. Tennessee relied on northbound riverboats to receive staple commodities from the Cumberland and Tennessee valleys. The idea of using the rivers to breach the Confederate defense line in the West was well known by the end of 1861; Union gunboats had been scanning Confederate fort-building on the twin rivers for months before the campaign. Ulysses S. Grant and the United States Navy captured control of the Cumberland and Tennessee Rivers in February 1862 and held off the Confederate counterattack at Shiloh in April of the same year.

Capture of Memphis and Nashville gave the Union control of the Western and Middle sections. Control was confirmed at the battle of Murfreesboro in early January 1863. After Nashville was captured (the first Confederate state capitol to fall) Andrew Johnson, an East Tennessean from Greeneville, was appointed military governor of the state by Lincoln. During this time, the military government abolished slavery (but with questionable legality). The Confederates continued to hold East Tennessee despite the strength of Unionist sentiment there, with the exception of strongly pro-Confederate Sullivan and Rhea Counties.

1863
After winning a victory at Chickamauga in September 1863, the Confederates besieged Chattanooga but were finally driven off by Grant in November. Many of the Confederate defeats can be attributed to the poor leadership of General Braxton Bragg, who led the Army of Tennessee from Shiloh to the Confederate defeat in the Chattanooga campaign. Historian Thomas Connelly concludes that although Bragg was an able planner and a skillful organizer, he failed repeatedly in operations, in part because he was unable to collaborate effectively with his subordinates.

1864
The last major battles came when General John Bell Hood led the Confederates north in November 1864. He was checked at Franklin, and his army was virtually destroyed by George Thomas's greatly superior forces at Nashville in December.

Battles in Tennessee 

 Anthony's Hill
 Bean's Station
 Blountville
 Blue Springs
 Brentwood
 Britton's Lane
 Brown's Ferry
 Bull's Gap
 Campbell's Station
 First Battle of Chattanooga
 Second Battle of Chattanooga
 Third Battle of Chattanooga
 Collierville
 Columbia
 Dandridge
 Dover
 Fair Garden
 Farmington
 Fort Donelson
 Fort Henry
 Fort Pillow
 Fort Sanders (a.k.a. Fort Loudon)
 First Battle of Franklin
 Second Battle of Franklin
 Hartsville
 Hatchie's Bridge (a.k.a. Davis Bridge or Matamoro)
 Hoover's Gap
 Island Number Ten
 Jackson
 Johnsonville
 Lebanon
 Lexington
 Liberty Gap
 First Battle of Memphis
 Second Battle of Memphis
Morristown
 Mossy Creek
 First Battle of Murfreesboro
 Third Battle of Murfreesboro
 Nashville
 Parker's Cross Roads
 Plum Point Bend
 Riggins Hill
 Battle of Rogersville (a.k.a. Big Creek)
 Shiloh
 Spring Hill
 Stones River (a.k.a. Second Battle of Murfreesboro)
 Thompson's Station
 Vaught's Hill (a.k.a. Milton)
 Wauhatchie (a.k.a. Brown's Berry)

Notable Confederate leaders from Tennessee

Notable Union leaders from Tennessee

Government and politics
Fear of subversion was widespread throughout the state. In West and Middle Tennessee it was fear of pro-Union activism, which was countered proactively by numerous local Committees of Safety and Vigilance from 1860 to 1862. They emerged as early as the 1860 Presidential election, and when the war began activists developed an aggressive program to detect and suppress Unionists. The committees set up a spy system, intercepted mail, inspected luggage, forced the enlistment of men into the Confederate Army, confiscated private property, and whenever it seemed necessary lynched enemies of the Confederacy. The committees were disbanded by the Union Army when it took control in 1862.

Unionism and East Tennessee

East Tennessee was a stronghold of Unionism; most slaves were house servants—luxuries—rather than the base of plantation operations. East Tennesseans feared that they would become second-class citizens in a country with a slave-owning aristocracy. The dominant mood strongly opposed secession. Tennesseans representing twenty-six East Tennessee counties met twice in Greeneville and Knoxville and agreed to secede from Tennessee (see East Tennessee Convention of 1861.) They petitioned the state legislature in Nashville, which denied their request to secede and sent Confederate troops under Felix Zollicoffer to occupy East Tennessee and prevent secession. The region thus came under Confederate control from 1861 to 1863. Nevertheless, East Tennessee supplied significant numbers of troops to the Federal army. (See also Nickajack.) Many East Tennesseans engaged in guerrilla warfare against state authorities by burning bridges, cutting telegraph wires, and spying for the North.  East Tennessee became an early base for the Republican Party in the South.  Strong support for the Union challenged the Confederate commanders who controlled East Tennessee for most of the war. Generals Felix K. Zollicoffer, Edmund Kirby Smith, and Sam Jones oscillated between harsh measures and conciliatory gestures to gain support but had little success whether they arrested hundreds of Unionist leaders or allowed men to escape the Confederate draft. Union forces finally captured the region in 1863. General William Sherman's famous March to the Sea saw him personally escorted by the 1st Alabama Cavalry Regiment, which consisted entirely of Unionist southerners. Despite its name, the regiment consisted largely of men from Tennessee.

Economy
Refugees poured into Nashville during the war, because jobs were plentiful in the depots, warehouses, and hospitals serving the war effort, and furthermore, the city was a much safer place than the countryside. Unionists and Confederate sympathizers both flooded in, as did free blacks and escaped slaves, and businessmen from the North. There was little heavy industry in the South but the Western Iron District in Middle Tennessee was the largest iron producer in the Confederacy in 1861. One of the largest operations was the Cumberland Iron Works, which the Confederate War Department tried and failed to protect. Memphis and Nashville, with very large transient populations, had flourishing red light districts. Union wartime regulations forced prostitutes to purchase licenses and pass medical exams, primarily to protect soldiers from venereal disease. Their trade was deregulated once military control ended.

Aftermath
In January 1865, a convention tasked with choosing delegates for a proposed constitutional convention decided it had the power to propose amendments to the Tennessee state constitution and present them for ratification in an election. Dominated by pro-Union forces allied with Military Governor Andrew Johnson, the convention proposed two constitutional amendments, one abolishing slavery and involuntary servitude unless imposed as punishment for a crime, and one repudiating the state's allegiance with the Confederate States of America. Both amendments were passed by voters on February 22, 1865. 
(A new proposed constitutional amendment that will go before the voters in 2022 will abolish slavery as a punishment for crime and remove it from the state constitution.) 

After the war, the state legislature ratified the Fourteenth Amendment to the United States Constitution on July 18, 1866, and was the first state readmitted to the Union on July 24, 1866. Because it ratified the Fourteenth Amendment, Tennessee was the only state that seceded from the Union that did not have a military governor during Reconstruction, nor was it part of any of the Reconstruction military districts. This did not placate those unhappy with the Confederate defeat. Many white Tennesseans resisted efforts to expand suffrage and other civil rights to the freedmen.

For generations, white Tennesseans had been raised to believe that slavery was justified. Some could not accept that their former slaves were now equal under the law. When the state Supreme Court upheld the constitutionality of African American suffrage in 1867, the reaction became stronger.  The Nashville Republican Banner on January 4, 1868, published an editorial calling for a revolutionary movement of white Southerners to unseat the one-party state rule imposed by the Republican Party and restore the legal inferiority of the region's black population.

"In this State, reconstruction has perfected itself and done its worst. It has organized a government which is as complete a closed corporation as may be found; it has placed the black man over the white as the agent and prime-move of domination; it has constructed a system of machinery by which all free guarantees, privileges and opportunities are removed from the people.... The impossibility of casting a free vote in Tennessee short of a revolutionary movement ... is an undoubted fact."

The Banner urged its readers to ignore the presidential election and direct their energy into building "a local movement here at home" to end Republican rule.

According to the 1860 census, African Americans made up only 25% of Tennessee's population, which meant they could not dominate politics. Only a few African Americans served in the Tennessee legislature during Reconstruction, and not many more as state and city officers. However, the Nashville Banner may have been reacting to increased participation by African Americans on that city's council, where they held about one-third of the seats. Tennessee has strong Confederate memories (based in West Tennessee and Middle Tennessee), which focused on the Lost Cause theme of heroic defense of traditional liberties. To a lesser extent Tennesseans celebrate Unionist memories based in East Tennessee and among blacks.

See also

 List of Tennessee Confederate Civil War units
 List of Tennessee Union Civil War units
 Nashville in the Civil War
 Chattanooga in the American Civil War

References

Footnotes

Citations

Sources

Further reading

 Alexander, Thomas B. Political Reconstruction in Tennessee (1968)
 Ash, Stephen V. Middle Tennessee society transformed, 1860–1870: war and peace in the Upper South (2006)
 Connelly, Thomas L. Civil War Tennessee: battles and leaders (1979) 106pp
 Connelly, Thomas L. Army of the Heartland: The Army of Tennessee, 1861–1862 (2 vol 1967–70); a Confederate army
 Cooling, Benjamin Franklin. Fort Donelson's Legacy: War and Society in Kentucky and Tennessee, 1862–1863 (1997)
 Cottrell, Steve. Civil War in Tennessee (2001) 142pp
 Daniel, Larry J. Shiloh: The Battle That Changed the Civil War (1998)  excerpt and text search
 Durham, Walter T. Nashville: The Occupied City, 1862–1863 (1985)
 Durham, Walter T. Reluctant Partners: Nashville and the Union, 1863–1865 (1987)
 Engle,  Stephen D. Don Carlos Buell: Most Promising of All (1999)
 Engle,  Stephen D. Struggle for the Heartland: The Campaigns from Fort Henry to Corinth (2001)
 Fisher, Noel C. War at Every Door: Partisan Politics and Guerrilla Violence in East Tennessee, 1860–1869 (2000) excerpt and text search
 Frisby, Derek W. Campaigns in Mississippi and Tennessee, February-December 1864 Center of Military History (2014) 67pp
 Groom, Winston. Shiloh, 1862: The First Great and Terrible Battle of the Civil War (2011)
 Jones, James B., ed. Tennessee in the Civil War: Selected Contemporary Accounts (2011) 286 pp
 Lepa, Jack H. The Civil War in Tennessee, 1862–1863 (2007)
 McCaslin, Richard B., ed. Portraits of Conflict: A Photographic History of Tennessee in the Civil War (2006)
 McKenzie, Robert Tracy. Lincolnites and Rebels: A Divided Town in the American Civil War (2009) on Knoxville excerpt and text search
 McKenzie, Robert Tracy.  One South or Many? Plantation Belt and Upcountry in Civil War-Era Tennessee (1994) uses longitudinal census data to demonstrate similar economic and social trends among Tennessee's three regions excerpt and text search
 Maslowski Peter. Treason Must Be Made Odious: Military Occupation and Wartime Reconstruction in Nashville, Tennessee, 1862–65 (1978).
 Sheeler, J. Reuben. "Secession and The Unionist Revolt," Journal of Negro History, 29#2 (1944), pp. 175–185 in JSTOR, covers east Tennessee
 Woodworth, Stephen E. Jefferson Davis and His Generals: The Failure of Confederate Command in the West (1990)
 Woodworth, Stephen E. Decision in the Heartland: The Civil War in the West (2011)
 Woodworth, Stephen E.  Six Armies in Tennessee: The Chickamauga and Chattanooga Campaigns (1998) * Temple, Oliver P. East Tennessee and the civil war (1899) 588pp online edition excerpt and text search
 Vaughan, Virginia C. Tennessee County History Series: Weakley County (1983, Memphis State University Press)

External links

 Follow day-by-day events during Tennessee's Civil War sesquicentennial (2011–2015)
 National Park Service map showing Civil War Sites in Tennessee
 The Battle of Franklin, November 30, 1864 (extensive site)
 The McGavock Confederate Cemetery at Franklin

 

 
.American Civil War
American Civil War by state
American Civil War
 
Western Theater of the American Civil War